The 2021–22 season is Plymouth Argyle's 136th year in their history and second consecutive season in League One. Along with the league, the club will also compete in the FA Cup, the EFL Cup and the EFL Trophy. The season covers the period from 1 July 2021 to 30 June 2022.

First-team squad

Statistics

|}

Goals record

Disciplinary record

Pre-season friendlies
Plymouth Argyle announced they will play friendlies against Plymouth Parkway, Bristol Rovers, Swansea City, Middlesbrough, Tavistock, Bristol City and Torquay United as part of their pre-season schedule.

Competitions

League One

League table

Results summary

Results by matchday

Matches
Plymouth's fixtures were announced on 24 June 2021.

FA Cup

Argyle were drawn away to Sheffield Wednesday in the first round, Rochdale in the second round, Birmingham City in the third round and Chelsea in the fourth round.

EFL Cup

Argyle were drawn away to Peterborough United in the first round and Swansea City in the second round.

EFL Trophy

Argyle were drawn into Southern Group F with Arsenal U21s, Newport County and Swindon Town. The group stage fixtures were confirmed on 3 August.

Transfers

Transfers in

Loans in

Loans out

Transfers out

References

Plymouth Argyle
Plymouth Argyle F.C. seasons